The C1W reactor is a nuclear reactor used by the United States Navy to provide electricity generation and propulsion on warships.  C1W reactors, like all United States Naval reactors, are pressurized water reactors. The C1W designation stands for:

 C = Cruiser platform
 1 = First generation core designed by the contractor
 W = Westinghouse was the contracted designer

This type of nuclear propulsion plant was used exclusively on the  guided missile cruiser, the world's first nuclear-powered cruiser.  The C1W was the only nuclear reactor ever explicitly earmarked for a cruiser (two of them, powering two geared turbines) with all subsequent nuclear cruisers powered by "D"-class (or destroyer-type) reactors.

, commissioned September 1961, was decommissioned May 1995.

References

 

United States naval reactors